The 49th annual Miss Puerto Rico Universe competition was held in the fall of 2003 in Puerto Rico. Alba Reyes won the pageant and represented Puerto Rico at Miss Universe 2004 in Quito, Ecuador.

Results

References

Puerto Rico 2004
2004 beauty pageants
2003 in Puerto Rico